Tan Sri Abang Abu Bakar bin Abang Mustapha (Jawi: ابڠ ابو بكر بن ابڠ مصطفى) is a former Minister in the Prime Minister 's Department from 1999 to 2003 and former Member of Parliament for Kuala Rajang, Sarawak.

Education
He received his primary school in St Thomas's School, Kuching then further his secondary school to the premier Malay College Kuala Kangsar. His later education was at King's College, Warrnambool, Australia, University of Adelaide, South Australia and Inner Temple, London and International Management Centre for his MBA which he received in 1990.

Career
He was the Managing Director of Progressive Insurance Sdn Bhd, Executive Secretary of Sarawak Alliance Party in 1970. MLA for Kuching Barat (1973-1981) and for Satok (1979-1981). He was also the Speaker of the State Council from 1976 to 1981, Member of Parliament for Paloh (1981-1990) and for Kuala Rajang (1990-2000). From 1988 to 1998, he was the Deputy President of Parti Pesaka Bumiputera Bersatu

In the Tun Dr Mahathir Mohamad first cabinet, he was appointed as the Deputy Minister of Defence, then the Minister in Prime Minister's Department in 1990-1999 and lastly the Minister of Defence in 1999–2003.

He was also active as the President of Sarawak Native Chamber of Commerce and Sarawak Muslim Welfare Association.

Honours

Honours of Malaysia
  : 
  Companion of the Order of the Defender of the Realm (JMN) (1981)
  Commander of the Order of Loyalty to the Crown of Malaysia (PSM) – Tan Sri (2013)

  Knight Companion of Order of Sultan Ahmad Shah of Pahang (DSAP) – Dato' (1984)

  Knight Commander of the Most Exalted Order of the Star of Sarawak (PNBS) – formerly Dato', now Dato Sri (1985)

  Knight Commander of the Grand Order of Tuanku Ja’afar (DPTJ) – Dato’ (1990)

Personal life
He was married Puan Sri Tunku Puan Sri Maziah binti Tunku Mustapha in 1974.

References

People from Sarawak
Living people
Commanders of the Order of Loyalty to the Crown of Malaysia
Government ministers of Malaysia
Parti Pesaka Bumiputera Bersatu politicians
Members of the Dewan Rakyat
Year of birth missing (living people)